Denmark national beach soccer team represents Denmark in international beach soccer competitions, but however is not controlled by the Danish Football Association (DFA), the governing body for football in Denmark. The DFA have decided to wait before being affiliated with an official national beach soccer team. However the team is recognised by the sport's governing body, Beach Soccer Worldwide (BSWW) and competes as Denmark's representative team in BSWW and FIFA sanctioned tournaments.

Denmark made an early entrance onto the international beach soccer scene by competing in the 1996 World Championship, finishing 6th out of 8 teams. However a Danish team did not return to internationals for 17 years until 2013 to compete in a BSWW Tour event in Sweden. In 2016, Denmark committed a team to multiple events in the beach soccer calendar for the first time, debuting in both the Euro Beach Soccer League and World Cup qualifiers.

Current squad
Correct as of June 2019

Head Coach: Ian Skøtt
Assistant Coach: Terry Bowes
Physio: Tobias Troels Øster

Notable players

2019
 Casper Dorph Jørgensen a.k.a. Dorph (MF)
 Henrik Rædkjær a.k.a. Ræd (FW)

Achievements
 Beach Soccer World Championship best: 6th place
 1996
 Euro Beach Soccer League best: 11th place, Division B
 2016
 2017
 2018
 2019

Results

All-time record
as of June 2019

Matches

1996

2013

2016

2017

2018

2019

External links

 BSWW Profile
 DBU - Beach Soccer
 Results

National sports teams of Denmark
Beach Soccer
European national beach soccer teams